Finnbråten is a village in the municipality of Eidsvoll, Norway. It is located a few kilometres east of Eidsvoll town. Its population (2005) is 749.

References

Villages in Akershus